Nations and Nationalism may refer to:
 Nations and Nationalism (book), a 1983 book by Ernest Gellner
 Nations and Nationalism (journal), an academic journal established in 1995